Mary Jackman (30 April 1943 – 30 May 2022) was an Irish Fine Gael politician. She was a senator from 1989 to 1992 and again from 1997 to 2002.

Biography
Jackman was from Castletroy in County Limerick. A teacher by profession, she spent her entire career at Presentation College, Limerick. 

A member of Limerick County Council for the Castleconnell local electoral area from 1985 to 2014, Jackman has unsuccessfully contested four general elections in the Limerick East constituency (1989, 1992, 1997, and 2002), falling just 305 votes short of winning seat at the 1997 general election. She was also defeated at the Limerick East by-election in March 1998, and did not stand at the 2007 general election.

After her 1989 defeat, she was elected to the 19th Seanad on the Labour Panel. She lost her seat at the 1993 Seanad elections, but was re-elected in 1997 to the 21st Seanad. At the 2002 Seanad elections, she stood instead on the Industrial and Commercial Panel, but did not win a seat. She died on 30 May 2022, aged 79.

References

1943 births
2022 deaths
Fine Gael senators
Members of the 19th Seanad
Members of the 21st Seanad
20th-century women members of Seanad Éireann
21st-century women members of Seanad Éireann
Local councillors in County Limerick